Nord-Sel Church is a parish church of the Church of Norway in Sel Municipality in Innlandet county, Norway. It is located in the village of Nord-Sel. It is the church for the Nord-Sel parish which is part of the Nord-Gudbrandsdal prosti (deanery) in the Diocese of Hamar. The brown, wooden church was built in a long church design in 1932 using plans drawn up by the architect Knut Villa. The church seats about 120 people.

History
Nord-Sel was then without a church for nearly 200 years. The new long church building was designed by Knut Villa. The building was constructed in 1931-1932 and it was consecrated in 1932. The nave is rectangular and has a small tower over the church porch in the southeast, the chancel is on the northwest end of the building, and there is a sacristy on the southwest side of the chancel.

Media gallery

See also
List of churches in Hamar

References

Sel
Churches in Innlandet
Long churches in Norway
Wooden churches in Norway
20th-century Church of Norway church buildings
Churches completed in 1932
1932 establishments in Norway